The Butterfield Bermuda Championship is a professional golf tournament on the PGA Tour that debuted in October/November 2019 as part of the 2020 season. The tournament is played at the Port Royal Golf Course, designed by Robert Trent Jones, in Southampton Parish, Bermuda. Originally designated as an alternate event, opposite the WGC-HSBC Champions, the prize fund in 2019 was US$3,000,000.

In 2020, 2021 and 2022, as a result of successive cancellations of the WGC-HSBC Champions due to COVID-19 pandemic considerations, the tournament was elevated to full FedEx Cup point event status, with the winner earning a Masters Tournament invitation. As a full-field tournament, the prize fund was US$4 million in the 2020, and US$6.5 million in 2021 as Butterfield Bank joined the Bermuda Tourism Board as co-title sponsors.

Winners

References

External links

Coverage on PGA Tour's official site

PGA Tour events
Golf in Bermuda
Recurring sporting events established in 2019